Hockenberry is a surname and can refer to:

Charles Hockenberry (1918–2007), American athlete and coach
John Hockenberry (born 1956), American journalist, author, commentator, and activist
Hockenberry (talk show), an American television show hosted by John Hockenberry